Saturday Night Theatre was a long-running radio drama strand on BBC Radio 4. The strand showcased feature-length, middle-brow single plays on Saturday evenings for more than 50 years, having been launched in April 1943. The plays featured in the strand included stage plays, book adaptations and original dramatisations. For most of its history, programmes ran for 90 minutes and were largely entertainment-centred, such as thrillers, comedies and mysteries.

Saturday Night Theatre was noted as the major drama of the week on BBC Radio 4, until it was scrapped as a programme strand in 1996. Shorter plays continued to be broadcast on Radio 4 on Saturday evenings from 1996 until the relaunch of the channel's schedule in April 1998 by James Boyle, when single dramas were removed from the Saturday evening schedule. Since 1998, the main weekly play on the station has been The Saturday Play, a daytime programme that runs for 60–90 minutes.

There have since been campaigns to bring back Saturday Night Theatre, but in the context of BBC budget cuts, that have included the 2010 axing of Radio 4's Friday Play (established in 1998, when Saturday Night Theatre was abolished), any return looks unlikely.

Many plays, mainly from the 1940s (when they weren't actually recorded) all the way through to the early 70s, are considered to be lost or destroyed, with the earliest surviving play, Look to the Lady, being from 1957 (although it is held in a private collection).

References

External links 
 Radio Plays at Suttonelms.org

BBC Radio 4 programmes